Karol Drzewiecki and Gonçalo Oliveira were the defending champions but chose not to defend their title.

Hans Hach Verdugo and Austin Krajicek won the title after defeating Robert Galloway and John-Patrick Smith 6–0, 6–3 in the final.

Seeds

Draw

References

External links
 Main draw

Monterrey Challenger - Doubles